MS ANT 1 was a ro-ro ferry operated by Stena Line between Larne, Northern Ireland and Fleetwood, England. The ferry did not carry passengers, insteading solely carrying freight.

History
The Stena Pioneer was built in 1975 as the Bison.  Initially ordered by Stena Line, the vessel was sold before entering service to P&O subsidiary Pandoro.

To cope with the increased traffic on the Fleetwood – Larne route the Bison was sent to the River Tyne in 1980 for lengthening.  The vessel was cut in two and a new 15-metre section added.

In 1989 the Bison was chartered to B&I Line for four years and placed on the Dublin – Liverpool route.

On return from her B&I Line charter the Bison was rebuilt to meet the latest SOLAS requirements.  This involved adding sponsons increasing the vessels breadth by 4 meters. Following this rebuilding the vessel's seakeeping was badly affected.  To cure this the Bison was sent to Cammell Laird in 1995 to have additional weight in the form of an extra vehicle deck added to the stern.

In 1998 Pandoro merged with P&O European Ferries (Felixstowe Ltd.) to create P&O Irish Sea.  The Bison was renamed European Pioneer.

In 2004 the ship passed into the hands of Stena Line. and was renamed Stena Pioneer.

In December 2010 the Stena Pioneer was laid up following the closure of the Fleetwood - Larne route. The Pioneer was sold to a Russian operator in June 2011 and renamed ANT 1.

Ant 1 & Ant 2 + Anna Marine (all the "Three Sisters") were Scrapped at Aliaga ship scrap Yards in February 2014.

References

Ferries of the United Kingdom
Ferries of Northern Ireland
Ferries of England
1974 ships